GSAS may refer to:
 Global Sustainability Assessment System
 Graduate School of Arts and Sciences (disambiguation)
 Garda Síochána Analysis Service, part of the Garda Crime and Security Branch, in Ireland

See also 
 GSA (disambiguation)